Campomanesia ilhoensis (synonym Campomanesia viatoris) is a species of plant in the family Myrtaceae.

The plant is endemic to the Atlantic Forest ecoregion in southeastern Brazil. It is occasionally distributed on the banks of the Rio Sâo Francisco in coastal Alagoas state.

References

ilhoensis
Endemic flora of Brazil
Flora of Alagoas
Flora of the Atlantic Forest
Endangered plants
Endangered biota of South America
Taxonomy articles created by Polbot